Uncial 068 (in the Gregory-Aland numbering), ε 3 (Soden), is a Greek uncial manuscript of the New Testament, dated paleographically to the 5th century. Tischendorf designated it by Ib, Scrivener by Nb. 
It has some marginalia.

Description 

The codex contains a fragments of the John 13:16-27; 16:7-19 (with lacunae), on 2 parchment leaves (26 cm by 24 cm). The text is written in two columns per page, 18 lines per page in large uncial letters. 
It has no capital letters. 

It is a double palimpsest, the Greek biblical text was overwritten twice in Syriac language, in the 9th century, and in the 10th or 11th century. It contains hymns of Severus in Syriac. The Ammonian Sections are present, but the Eusebian Canons absent. It contains breathing and accents. It has itacistic errors (e.g. κρεισεως in John 16:8).

 Contents 
John 13:16-17.19-20.23-24.26-27; 16:7-9.12-13.15-16.18-19

Text 

The Greek text of this codex is a representative of the Alexandrian text-type, with some non-Alexandrian readings (e.g. J 16:12). Aland placed in Category III.

 John 16:7-8,12-15

 John 16:15-16.18-19

History 

Currently the manuscript is dated by the INTF to the 5th century.

The manuscript was found in 1847 in the monastery at Nitrian Desert and brought to London. It was examined and deciphered by Tregelles and Tischendorf (about the same time). 

 Location 
The codex is now located at the British Library (Add MS 17136) in London.

See also 
 List of New Testament uncials
 Textual criticism
 Double palimpsests
 British Library, Add. 17212
 Codex Vaticanus 2061

References

Further reading 

 Constantin von Tischendorf, Monumenta sacra et profana II (Leipzig: 1857), pp. 311-312. 
 U. B. Schmid, D. C. Parker, W. J. Elliott, The Gospel according to St. John: The majuscules (Brill 2007), pp. 59-60. [text of the codex in new reconstruction]

Palimpsests
Greek New Testament uncials
5th-century biblical manuscripts
British Library additional manuscripts